Gymnopilus pacificus is a species of mushroom-forming fungus in the family Hymenogastraceae.

Description

Habitat and distribution
Gymnopilus pacificus grows on wood in Mississippi and Hawaii, between May and June.

See also

List of Gymnopilus species

References

pacificus
Fungi of the United States
Fungi of Hawaii
Fungi described in 1969
Taxa named by Lexemuel Ray Hesler
Fungi without expected TNC conservation status